Chiang Kai‐shek (31 October 1887 – 5 April 1975), also known as Jiang Zhongzheng and Jiang Jieshi, was a Chinese politician, revolutionary, and military leader who served as the leader of the Republic of China (ROC) and the Generalissimo from 1928 to his death in 1975 – until 1949 in Mainland China and from then on in Taiwan. Following the Kuomintang's defeat by the Communist Party of China in the Chinese Civil War, he continued to lead the ROC government in Taiwan until his death.

Born in the Chekiang (Zhejiang) Province, Chiang was a member of the Kuomintang (KMT), and a lieutenant of Sun Yat-sen in the revolution to overthrow the Beiyang government and reunify China. With help from the Soviets and the Chinese Communist Party (CCP), Chiang organized the military for Sun's Canton Nationalist Government and headed the Whampoa Military Academy. As commander-in-chief of the National Revolutionary Army (from which he came to be known as a Generalissimo), he led the Northern Expedition from 1926 to 1928, before defeating a coalition of warlords and nominally reunifying China under a new Nationalist government. Midway through the Northern Expedition, the KMT–CCP alliance broke down and Chiang massacred communists inside the party, triggering a civil war with the CCP, which he eventually lost in 1949.

As the leader of the Republic of China in the Nanjing decade, Chiang sought to strike a difficult balance between modernizing China, while also devoting resources to defending the nation against the CCP, warlords, and the impending Japanese threat. Trying to avoid a war with Japan while hostilities with the CCP continued, he was kidnapped in the Xi'an Incident, and obliged to form an Anti-Japanese United Front with the CCP. Following the Marco Polo Bridge Incident in 1937, he mobilized China for the Second Sino-Japanese War. For eight years, he led the war of resistance against a vastly superior enemy, mostly from the wartime capital Chongqing. As the leader of a major Allied power, Chiang met with British Prime Minister Winston Churchill and U.S. President Franklin D. Roosevelt in the Cairo Conference to discuss terms for the Japanese surrender. When the Second World War ended, the Civil War with the communists (by then led by Mao Zedong) resumed. Chiang's nationalists were mostly defeated in a few decisive battles in 1948. In 1949, Chiang's government and army retreated to the island of Taiwan, where Chiang imposed martial law and persecuted critics during the White Terror. Presiding over a period of social reforms and economic prosperity, Chiang won five elections to six-year terms as President of the Republic of China in which he faced minimal opposition or was elected unopposed. Three years into his fifth term as president, and one year before Mao Zedong's death, he died in 1975. He was also director general of the Kuomintang until his death.

One of the longest-serving non-royal heads of state in the 20th century, Chiang was the longest-serving non-royal ruler of China, having held the post for 46 years. Like Mao, he is regarded as a controversial figure. Supporters credit him with playing a major part in unifying the nation and leading the Chinese resistance against Japan, as well as with countering communist influence and economic development in both Mainland China and Taiwan. Detractors and critics denounce him as a brutal dictator, and often accuse him of being a fascist at the front of a corrupt authoritarian regime that suppressed civilians and political dissents, as well as flooding the Yellow River that subsequently caused the Henan Famine during the Second Sino-Japanese War. Other historians such as Jay Taylor argued that despite his many faults, Chiang's ideology notably differs from other authoritarian dictators of the 20th century and does not espouse the ideology of fascism. He argued that Chiang made genuine efforts to improve the economic and social conditions of mainland China and Taiwan such as improving women's rights and land reform. Chiang was also credited with transforming China from a semi-colony of various imperialist powers to an independent country by amending the unequal treaties signed by previous governments, as well as moving various Chinese national treasures and traditional Chinese artworks to the National Palace Museum in Taipei during the 1949 retreat, thus saving them from likely destruction.

Names
Like many other Chinese historical figures, Chiang used several names throughout his life. The name inscribed in the genealogical records of his family is Chiang Chou-t‘ai. This so-called "register name" is the one by which his extended relatives knew him, and the one he used in formal occasions, such as when he was married. In deference to tradition, family members did not use the register name in conversation with people outside of the family. The concept of a "real" or original name is/was not as clear-cut in China as it is in the Western world. In honor of tradition, Chinese families waited a number of years before officially naming their children. In the meantime, they used a "milk name", given to the infant shortly after his birth and known only to the close family. So the name that Chiang received at birth was Chiang Jui-yüan.

In 1903, the 16-year-old Chiang went to Ningbo as a student, and chose a "school name". This was the formal name of a person, used by older people to address him, and the one he would use the most in the first decades of his life (as a person grew older, younger generations would use one of the courtesy names instead). Colloquially, the school name is called "big name", whereas the "milk name" is known as the "small name". The school name that Chiang chose for himself was Zhiqing (which means "purity of aspirations"). For the next fifteen years or so, Chiang was known as Jiang Zhiqing (Wade-Giles: Chiang Chi-ch‘ing). This is the name by which Sun Yat-sen knew him when Chiang joined the republicans in Kwangtung in the 1910s.

In 1912, when Jiang Zhiqing was in Japan, he started to use the name Chiang Kai-shek as a pen name for the articles that he published in a Chinese magazine he founded: Voice of the Army. Jieshi is the Pinyin romanization of this name, based on Mandarin, but the most recognized romanized rendering is Kai-shek which is in Cantonese romanization. Because the Republic of China was based in Canton (a Cantonese-speaking area, now known as Guangdong), Chiang (who never spoke Cantonese but was a native Wu speaker) became known by Westerners under the Cantonese romanization of his courtesy name, while the family name as known in English seems to be the Mandarin pronunciation of his Chinese family name, transliterated in Wade-Giles.

"Kai-shek"/"Jieshi" soon became Chiang's courtesy name. Others note that the first character of his courtesy name is also the first character of the courtesy name of his brother and other male relatives on the same generational line, while the second character of his courtesy name shi (—meaning "stone") suggests the second character of his "register name" tai (—the famous Mount Tai). Courtesy names in China often bore a connection with the personal name of the person. As the courtesy name is the name used by people of the same generation to address the person, Chiang soon became known under this new name.

Sometime in 1917 or 1918, as Chiang became close to Sun Yat-sen, he changed his name from Jiang Zhiqing to Jiang Zhongzheng. By adopting the name Chung-cheng ("central uprightness"), he was choosing a name very similar to the name of Sun Yat-sen, who was (and still is) known among Chinese as Zhongshan (—meaning "central mountain"), thus establishing a link between the two. The meaning of uprightness, rectitude, or orthodoxy, implied by his name, also positioned him as the legitimate heir of Sun Yat-sen and his ideas. It was readily accepted by members of the Chinese Nationalist Party and is the name under which Chiang Kai-shek is still commonly known in Taiwan. However, the name was often rejected by the Chinese communists and is not as well known in mainland China. Often the name is shortened to "Chung-cheng" only ("Zhongzheng" in Pinyin). Many public places in Taiwan are named Chungcheng after Chiang. For many years passengers arriving at the Chiang Kai-shek International Airport were greeted by signs in Chinese welcoming them to the "Chung Cheng International Airport". Similarly, the monument erected to Chiang's memory in Taipei, known in English as Chiang Kai-shek Memorial Hall, was literally named "Chung Cheng Memorial Hall" in Chinese. In Singapore, Chung Cheng High School was named after him.

His name is also written in Taiwan as "The Late President Honorable Chiang", where the one-character-wide space in front of his name known as Nuo tai shows respect. He is often called Honorable Chiang (without the title or space).

In this context, his surname "Chiang" in this article is spelled using the Wade-Giles system of transliteration for Standard Chinese as opposed to Hanyu Pinyin (which is spelled as "Jiang") though the latter was adopted by the Republic of China government in 2009 as its official romanization.

Early life 
He was the third child and second son of his father  (also Chiang Su-an; 1842–1895) and the first child of his father's third wife  (1863–1921) who were members of a prosperous family of salt merchants. Chiang's father died when he was eight, and he wrote of his mother as the "embodiment of Confucian virtues". The young Chiang was inspired throughout his youth by the realization that the reputation of an honored family rested upon his shoulders. He was a naughty child. At a young age he was interested in war. As he grew older, Chiang became more aware of the issues that surrounded him and in his speech to the Kuomintang in 1945 said:

In early 1906, Chiang cut off his queue, the required hairstyle of men during the Qing dynasty, and had it sent home from school, shocking the people in his hometown.

Education in Japan

Chiang grew up at a time in which military defeats, natural disasters, famines, revolts, unequal treaties and civil wars had left the Manchu-dominated Qing dynasty destabilized and in debt. Successive demands of the Western powers and Japan since the Opium War had left China owing millions of taels of silver. During his first visit to Japan to pursue a military career from April 1906 to later that year, he describes himself as having strong nationalistic feelings with a desire, among other things, to 'expel the Manchu Qing and to restore China'. In a 1969 speech, Chiang related a story about his boat trip to Japan at nineteen years old. Another passenger on the ship, a Chinese fellow student who was in the habit of spitting on the floor, was chided by a Chinese sailor who said that Japanese people did not spit on the floor, but instead would spit into a handkerchief. Chiang used the story as an example of how the common man in 1969 Taiwan had not developed the spirit of public sanitation that Japan had. Chiang decided to pursue a military career. He began his military training at the Baoding Military Academy in 1906, the same year Japan left its bimetallic currency standard, devaluing its yen. He left for Tokyo Shinbu Gakko, a preparatory school for the Imperial Japanese Army Academy intended for Chinese students, in 1907. There, he came under the influence of compatriots to support the revolutionary movement to overthrow the Manchu-dominated Qing dynasty and to set up a Han-dominated Chinese republic. He befriended Chen Qimei, and in 1908 Chen brought Chiang into the Tongmenghui, an important revolutionary brotherhood of the era. Finishing his military schooling at Tokyo Shinbu Gakko, Chiang served in the Imperial Japanese Army from 1909 to 1911.

Returning to China
After learning of the Wuchang uprising, Chiang returned to China in 1911, intending to fight as an artillery officer. He served in the revolutionary forces, leading a regiment in Shanghai under his friend and mentor Chen Qimei, as one of Chen's chief lieutenants. In early 1912 a dispute arose between Chen and Tao Chen-chang, an influential member of the Revolutionary Alliance who opposed both Sun Yat-sen and Chen. Tao sought to avoid escalating the quarrel by hiding in a hospital, but Chiang discovered him there. Chen dispatched assassins. Chiang may not have taken part in the assassination, but would later assume responsibility to help Chen avoid trouble. Chen valued Chiang despite Chiang's already legendary temper, regarding such bellicosity as useful in a military leader.

Chiang's friendship with Chen Qimei signaled an association with Shanghai's criminal syndicate (the Green Gang headed by Du Yuesheng and Huang Jinrong). During Chiang's time in Shanghai, the Shanghai International Settlement police observed him and eventually charged him with various felonies. These charges never resulted in a trial, and Chiang was never jailed.

Chiang became a founding member of the Nationalist Party (a forerunner of the KMT) after the success (February 1912) of the 1911 Revolution. After the takeover of the Republican government by Yuan Shikai and the failed Second Revolution in 1913, Chiang, like his KMT comrades, divided his time between exile in Japan and the havens of the Shanghai International Settlement. In Shanghai, Chiang cultivated ties with the city's underworld gangs, which were dominated by the notorious Green Gang and its leader Du Yuesheng. On 18 May 1916 agents of Yuan Shikai assassinated Chen Qimei. Chiang then succeeded Chen as leader of the Chinese Revolutionary Party in Shanghai. Sun Yat-sen's political career reached its lowest point during this time – most of his old Revolutionary Alliance comrades refused to join him in the exiled Chinese Revolutionary Party.

Establishing the Kuomintang's position 
In 1917, Sun Yat-sen moved his base of operations to Canton (now known as Guangzhou) and Chiang joined him in 1918. At this time Sun remained largely sidelined; without arms or money, he was soon expelled from Guangdong (Canton province) and exiled again to Shanghai. He was restored to Guangdong with mercenary help in 1920. After his return to Guangdong, a rift developed between Sun, who sought to militarily unify China under the KMT, and Guangdong Governor Chen Jiongming, who wanted to implement a federalist system with Guangdong as a model province. On 16 June 1922 Ye Ju, a general of Chen's whom Sun had attempted to exile, led an assault on Guangdong's Presidential Palace. Sun had already fled to the naval yard and boarded the SS Haiqi, but his wife narrowly evaded shelling and rifle-fire as she fled. They met on the SS Yongfeng, where Chiang joined them as swiftly as he could return from Shanghai, where he was ritually mourning his mother's death. For about 50 days, Chiang stayed with Sun, protecting and caring for him and earning his lasting trust. They abandoned their attacks on Chen on 9 August, taking a British ship to Hong Kong and traveling to Shanghai by steamer.

Sun regained control of Guangdong in early 1923, again with the help of mercenaries from Yunnan and of the Comintern. Undertaking a reform of the KMT, he established a revolutionary government aimed at unifying China under the KMT. That same year Sun sent Chiang to spend three months in Moscow studying the Soviet political and military system. During his trip to Russia, Chiang met Leon Trotsky and other Soviet leaders, but quickly came to the conclusion that the Russian model of government was not suitable for China. Chiang later sent his eldest son, Ching-Kuo, to study in Russia. After his father's split from the First United Front in 1927, Ching-Kuo was forced to stay there, as a hostage, until 1937. Chiang wrote in his diary, "It is not worth it to sacrifice the interest of the country for the sake of my son." Chiang even refused to negotiate a prisoner swap for his son in exchange for the Chinese Communist Party leader. His attitude remained consistent, and he continued to maintain, by 1937, that "I would rather have no offspring than sacrifice our nation's interests." Chiang had absolutely no intention of ceasing the war against the Communists.

Chiang Kai-shek returned to Guangdong and in 1924 Sun appointed him Commandant of the Whampoa Military Academy. Chiang resigned from the office after one month in disagreement with Sun's extremely close cooperation with the Comintern, but returned at Sun's demand. The early years at Whampoa allowed Chiang to cultivate a cadre of young officers loyal to both the KMT and himself.

Throughout his rise to power, Chiang also benefited from membership within the nationalist Tiandihui fraternity, to which Sun Yat-sen also belonged, and which remained a source of support during his leadership of the Kuomintang.

Rising power

Sun Yat-sen died on 12 March 1925, creating a power vacuum in the Kuomintang. A contest ensued among Wang Jingwei, Liao Zhongkai, and Hu Hanmin. In August, Liao was assassinated and Hu was arrested for his connections to the murderers. Wang Jingwei, who had succeeded Sun as chairman of the Kwangtung regime, seemed ascendant but was forced into exile by Chiang following the Canton Coup. The , renamed the Zhongshan in Sun's honour, had appeared off Changzhou—the location of the Whampoa Academy—on apparently falsified orders and amid a series of unusual phone calls trying to ascertain Chiang's location. He initially considered fleeing Kwangtung and even booked passage on a Japanese steamer, but then decided to use his military connections to declare martial law on 20 March 1926, and crack down on Communist and Soviet influence over the NRA, the military academy, and the party. The right wing of the party supported him and Stalin—anxious to maintain Soviet influence in the area—had his lieutenants agree to Chiang's demands regarding a reduced Communist presence in the KMT leadership in exchange for certain other concessions. The rapid replacement of leadership enabled Chiang to effectively end civilian oversight of the military after 15 May, though his authority was somewhat limited by the army's own regional composition and divided loyalties.

On 5 June 1926, he was named commander-in-chief of the National Revolutionary Army and, on 27 July, he finally launched Sun's long-delayed Northern Expedition, aimed at conquering the northern warlords and bringing China together under the KMT.

The NRA branched into three divisions: to the west was the returned Wang Jingwei, who led a column to take Wuhan; Bai Chongxi's column went east to take Shanghai; Chiang himself led in the middle route, planning to take Nanjing before pressing ahead to capture Beijing. However, in January 1927, Wang Jingwei and his KMT leftist allies took the city of Wuhan amid much popular mobilization and fanfare. Allied with a number of Chinese Communists and advised by Soviet agent Mikhail Borodin, Wang declared the national government as having moved to Wuhan. Having taken Nanjing in March (and briefly visited Shanghai, now under the control of his close ally Bai Chongxi), Chiang halted his campaign and prepared a violent break with Wang's leftist elements, which he believed threatened his control of the KMT.

In 1927, when he was setting up the Nationalist government in Nanjing, he was preoccupied with "the elevation of our leader Dr. Sun Yat-sen to the rank of 'Father of our Chinese Republic'. Dr. Sun worked for 40 years to lead our people in the Nationalist cause, and we cannot allow any other personality to usurp this honored position". He asked Chen Guofu to purchase a photograph that had been taken in Japan  or 1898. When told that it was not for sale, Chiang offered a million dollars to recover the photo and its negative. "The party must have this picture and the negative at any price. They must be destroyed as soon as possible. It would be embarrassing to have our Father of the Chinese Republic shown in a subordinate position". Chiang never obtained either the photo or its negative.

On 12 April 1927, Chiang carried out a purge of thousands of suspected Communists and dissidents in Shanghai, and began large-scale massacres across the country collectively known as the "White Terror". During April, more than  people were killed in Shanghai. The killings drove most Communists from urban cities and into the rural countryside, where the KMT was less powerful. In the year after April 1927, over 300,000 people died across China in the anti-Communist suppression campaigns, executed by the KMT. One of the most famous quotes from Chiang (during that time) was, that he would rather mistakenly kill 1,000 innocent people, than allow one Communist to escape. Some estimates claim the White Terror in China took millions of lives, most of them in rural areas. No concrete number can be verified. Chiang allowed Soviet agent and advisor Mikhail Borodin and Soviet general Vasily Blücher (Galens) to "escape" to safety after the purge.

The National Revolutionary Army (NRA) formed by the KMT swept through southern and central China until it was checked in Shandong, where confrontations with the Japanese garrison escalated into armed conflict. The conflicts were collectively known as the Jinan incident of 1928.

Now with an established national government in Nanjing, and supported by conservative allies including Hu Hanmin, Chiang's expulsion of the Communists and their Soviet advisers led to the beginning of the Chinese Civil War. Wang Jingwei's National Government was weak militarily, and was soon ended by Chiang with the support of a local warlord (Li Zongren of Guangxi). Eventually, Wang and his leftist party surrendered to Chiang and joined him in Nanjing. However, the cracks between Chiang and Hu Hanmin's traditionally Right-Wing KMT faction, the Western Hills Group, began to show soon after the cleansing against the communists, and Chiang later imprisoned Hu.

Though Chiang had consolidated the power of the KMT in Nanking, it was still necessary to capture Beiping (Beijing) to claim the legitimacy needed for international recognition. Beijing was taken in June 1928, from an alliance of the warlords Feng Yuxiang and Yan Xishan. Yan Xishan moved in and captured Beiping on behalf of his new allegiance after the death of Zhang Zuolin in 1928. His successor, Zhang Xueliang, accepted the authority of the KMT leadership, and the Northern Expedition officially concluded, completing Chiang's nominal unification of China and ending the Warlord Era.

After the Northern Expedition ended in 1928, Yan Xishan, Feng Yuxiang, Li Zongren and Zhang Fakui broke off relations with Chiang shortly after a demilitarization conference in 1929, and together they formed an anti-Chiang coalition to openly challenge the legitimacy of the Nanjing government. In the Central Plains War, they were defeated.

Chiang made great efforts to gain recognition as the official successor of Sun Yat-sen. In a pairing of great political significance, Chiang was Sun's brother-in-law. He had married Soong Mei-ling, the younger sister of Soong Ching-ling, Sun's widow, on 1 December 1927. Originally rebuffed in the early 1920s, Chiang managed to ingratiate himself to some degree with Soong Mei-ling's mother by first divorcing his wife and concubines and promising to sincerely study the precepts of Christianity. He read the copy of the Bible that May-ling had given him twice before making up his mind to become a Christian, and three years after his marriage he was baptized in the Soong's Methodist church. Although some observers felt that he adopted Christianity as a political move, studies of his recently opened diaries suggest that his faith was strong and sincere and that he felt that Christianity reinforced Confucian moral teachings.

Upon reaching Beijing, Chiang paid homage to Sun Yat-sen and had his body moved to the new capital of Nanjing to be enshrined in a mausoleum, the Sun Yat-sen Mausoleum.

In the West and in the Soviet Union, Chiang Kai-shek was known as the "Red General". Movie theaters in the Soviet Union showed newsreels and clips of Chiang. At Moscow, Sun Yat-sen University portraits of Chiang were hung on the walls; and, in the Soviet May Day Parades that year, Chiang's portrait was to be carried along with the portraits of Karl Marx, Vladimir Lenin, Joseph Stalin, and other Communist leaders. The United States consulate and other Westerners in Shanghai were concerned about the approach of "Red General" Chiang as his army was seizing control of large areas of the country in the Northern Expedition.

Rule

 

Having gained control of China, Chiang's party remained surrounded by "surrendered" warlords who remained relatively autonomous within their own regions. On 10 October 1928, Chiang was named director of the State Council, the equivalent to President of the country, in addition to his other titles. As with his predecessor Sun Yat-sen, the Western media dubbed him "Generalissimo".

According to Sun Yat-sen's plans, the Kuomintang (KMT) was to rebuild China in three steps: military rule, political tutelage, and constitutional rule. The ultimate goal of the KMT revolution was democracy, which was not considered to be feasible in China's fragmented state. Since the KMT had completed the first step of revolution through seizure of power in 1928, Chiang's rule thus began a period of what his party considered to be "political tutelage" in Sun Yat-sen's name. During this so-called Republican Era, many features of a modern, functional Chinese state emerged and developed.

From 1928 to 1937, a time period known as the Nanjing decade, some aspects of foreign imperialism, concessions and privileges in China were moderated through diplomacy. The government acted to modernize the legal and penal systems, attempted to stabilize prices, amortize debts, reform the banking and currency systems, build railroads and highways, improve public health facilities, legislate against traffic in narcotics, and augment industrial and agricultural production. Efforts were made to improve education standards, and the national academy of sciences, Academia Sinica, was founded. In an effort to unify Chinese society, the New Life Movement was launched to encourage Confucian moral values and personal discipline. Guoyu ("national language") was promoted as a standard tongue, and the establishment of communications facilities (including radio) were used to encourage a sense of Chinese nationalism in a way that was not possible when the nation lacked an effective central government. Under this context, the Chinese Rural Reconstruction Movement was implemented by some social activists who graduated as professors of the United States with tangible but limited progress in modernizing the tax, infrastructural, economic, cultural, and educational equipment, and mechanisms of rural regions. The social activists actively coordinated with the local governments in towns and villages since the early 1930s. However, this policy was subsequently neglected and canceled by Chiang's government due to rampant wars and the lack of resources following the Second Sino-Japanese War and the Second Chinese Civil War.

Despite being a conservative, Chiang supported modernization policies such as scientific advancement, universal education, and women's rights. The Kuomintang and the Nationalist Government supported women's suffrage and education and the abolition of polygamy and foot binding. Under Chiang's leadership, the Republic of China government also enacted a women's quota in the parliament with reserved seats for women. During the Nanjing Decade, average Chinese citizens received education they had been denied by the dynasties. This increased the literacy rate across China. The education also promoted the ideals of Tridemism of democracy, republicanism, science, constitutionalism, and Chinese Nationalism based on the Political Tutelage of the Kuomintang.

Any successes that the Nationalists did make, however, were met with constant political and military upheavals. While much of the urban areas were now under the control of the KMT, much of the countryside remained under the influence of weakened yet undefeated warlords, landlords, and Communists. Chiang often resolved issues of warlord obstinacy through military action, but such action was costly in terms of men and material. The 1930 Central Plains War alone nearly bankrupted the Nationalist government and caused almost  casualties on both sides. In 1931, Hu Hanmin, Chiang's old supporter, publicly voiced a popular concern that Chiang's position as both premier and president flew in the face of the democratic ideals of the Nationalist government. Chiang had Hu put under house arrest, but he was released after national condemnation, after which he left Nanjing and supported a rival government in Canton. The split resulted in a military conflict between Hu's Kwangtung government and Chiang's Nationalist government. Chiang only won the campaign against Hu after a shift in allegiance by Zhang Xueliang, who had previously supported Hu Hanmin.

Throughout his rule, complete eradication of the Communists remained Chiang's dream. After assembling his forces in Jiangxi, Chiang led his armies against the newly established Chinese Soviet Republic. With help from foreign military advisers such as Max Bauer and Alexander von Falkenhausen, Chiang's Fifth Campaign finally surrounded the Chinese Red Army in 1934. The Communists, tipped off that a Nationalist offensive was imminent, retreated in the Long March, during which Mao Zedong rose from a mere military official to the most influential leader of the Chinese Communist Party.

Chiang, as a nationalist and a Confucianist, was against the iconoclasm of the May Fourth Movement. Motivated by his sense of nationalism, he viewed some Western ideas as foreign, and he believed that the great introduction of Western ideas and literature that the May Fourth Movement promoted was not beneficial to China. He and Dr. Sun criticized the May Fourth intellectuals as corrupting the morals of China's youth.

Some have classified his rule as fascist. The New Life Movement initiated by Chiang was based upon Confucianism, mixed with Christianity, nationalism and authoritarianism that have some similarities to fascism. Frederic Wakeman suggested that the New Life Movement was "Confucian fascism". Under Chiang's rule, there also existed the Blue Shirts Society, which was largely modelled on those of the Blackshirts in the National Fascist Party and the Sturmabteilung of the Nazi Party. Its ideology was to expel foreign (Japanese and Western) imperialists from China and to crush communism. Close Sino-German ties also promoted cooperation between the Kuomintang and the Weimar German government and later Hitler's Nazi regime. Mao Zedong once derogatorily compared Chiang to Adolf Hitler, referring to Chiang as the "Führer of China". However, Chiang repeatedly attacked his enemies such as the Empire of Japan as fascistic and ultra-militaristic. The Sino-German relationship also rapidly deteriorated as Germany failed to pursue detente between China and Japan, which led to the outbreak of the Second Sino-Japanese War. China later declared war on fascist countries, including Germany, Italy, and Japan, as part of Declarations of war during World War II.

Chinese Communists and many conservative anti-communist writers have argued that Chiang was pro-capitalism based on the alliance thesis (the alliance between Chiang and the capitalists to purge the communist and leftist elements in Shanghai, as well as in the resulting Chinese Civil War). However, Chiang also antagonized the capitalists of Shanghai, often attacking them and confiscating their capital and assets for the use of the government, even while he denounced and fought against communists. Critics have labeled this as "bureaucratic capitalism". Historian Parks M. Coble argues that the phrase "bureaucratic capitalism" is too simplistic to adequately characterize this phenomenon. Instead he says, the regime weakened all social forces so that the government could pursue policies without being responsible nor responsive to any outside political groups. By defeating any potential challenge to its power, government officials could amass sizable fortunes. With this motive, Chiang cracked down pro-communist worker and peasant organizations, as well as rich Shanghai capitalists. Chiang also continued the rhethoric of the anti-capitalist Sun Yat-sen and directed Kuomintang media to openly attack the capitalists and capitalism. He supported government controlled industries instead. Parks M. Coble says that this rhethoric had no impact on governmental policy and that its use was to prevent the capitalists from claiming legitimacy within the party or society, and to control them and their wealth. 

Also, contrary to the critique that Chiang was highly corrupt, he himself was not involved in corruption. However his wife, Soong Mei-ling ignored her family's involvement in corruption. The Soong family's eldest son, T.V. Soong, was premier and China's finance minister, while the eldest daughter, Soong Ai-ling, was wife to Kung Hsiang-hsi, the wealthiest man in China. The second daughter, Soong Ching-ling, was wife to Sun Yat-sen, China's founding father. The youngest daughter, Soong Mei-ling, married Chiang in 1927, and following the marriage, these families became intimately connected, creating the "Soong dynasty" and the "Four Families". However, Soong was also credited for her campaign for women's rights in China, including her attempts to improve the education, culture, and social benefits of Chinese women.  Critics have said that the "Four Families" monopolized the regime and looted it. The US sent considerable aid to the Nationalist government, but soon realized the widespread corruption. Military supplies that were sent, appeared on the black market. Significant sums of money transmitted through T. V. Soong, China's finance minister, soon disappeared. President Truman has famously said "They're thieves, every damn one of them", referring to Nationalist leaders. "They stole $750 million out of the billions that we sent to Chiang. They stole it, and it's invested in real estate down in São Paolo and some right here in New York." Soong Mei-ling and Soong Ai-ling lived luxurious lifestyles and held millions in property, clothes, art, and jewelry. Soong Ai-ling and Soong Mei-ling were also the two richest women in China. Despite living a luxurious life for almost her entire life, Soong Mei-ling left only a $120,000 inheritance, and the reason is, according to her niece, that she donated most of her wealth when she was still alive. Chiang requiring support, tolerated corruption with people in his inner circles, as well as high-ranking nationalist officials, but not of lower-ranking officers. Where in 1934, he ordered seven military officers who embezzled state property to be shot. While in another case, several division commanders pleaded with Chiang to pardon a criminal officer, but as soon as the division commanders left, Chiang ordered him shot. Deputy editor and chief reporter at the Central Daily News, Lu Keng, made headline international news by exposing the corruption of two senior officials, Kong Xiangxi (H. H. Kung) and Song Ziwen (T.V. Soong). Chiang then ordered a thorough investigation of the Central Daily News, to find the source. But Lu Keng, risking execution, refused to comply and protected his journalists. Chiang wanting to avoid an international response, jailed Lu Keng instead. Chiang realized the widespread problems that the corruption was creating, so he undertook several anti-corruption campaigns before WW2 and after WW2 with varying success. Before WW2, both campaigns, the Nanjing Decade Cleanup of 1927-1930 and the Wartime Reform Movement of 1944-47, failed. And after WW2 and the Chinese Civil War, both campaigns, the Kuomingtang Reconstruction of 1950-1952 and the Governmental Rejuvenation of 1969-1973, succeeded. 

Chiang viewed all of the foreign great powers with suspicion, writing in a letter that they "all have it in their minds to promote the interests of their own respective countries at the cost of other nations" and seeing it as hypocritical for any of them to condemn each other's foreign policy. He used diplomatic persuasion on the United States, Germany, and the Soviet Union to regain lost Chinese territories as he viewed all foreign powers as imperialists who were attempting to exploit China.

Excess Mortality under Nationalist rule
Historian Rudolph Rummel documents that from its founding down to its defeat in 1949, the Nationalist government under Chiang's central leadership probably caused the deaths of between roughly 6 and 18.5  million people.  The major causes include:
Thousands of communists and communist sympathizers were killed during and in the year after the 1927 Shanghai massacre.
 In 1938, to stop Japanese advance, Chiang ordered the Yellow River dikes to be breached. An official postwar commission estimated that the total number of those who perished from malnutrition, famine, disease, or drowning might be as high as 800,000.
In 1943, 1.75 to 2.5 million Henan civilians starved to death due to grain being confiscated and sold for the profit of Nationalist government officials.
4,212,000 Chinese perished during the Second Sino-Japanese War and Civil War starving to death or dying from disease during conscription campaigns.

First phase of the Chinese Civil War

In Nanjing, in April 1931, Chiang Kai-shek attended a national leadership conference with Zhang Xueliang and General Ma Fuxiang, in which Chiang and Zhang dauntlessly upheld that Manchuria was part of China in the face of the Japanese invasion. After the Japanese invasion of Manchuria in 1931, Chiang resigned as Chairman of the National Government. He returned shortly afterward, adopting the slogan "first internal pacification, then external resistance". However, this policy of avoiding a frontal war against the Japanese was widely unpopular. In 1932, while Chiang was seeking first to defeat the Communists, Japan launched an advance on Shanghai and bombarded Nanjing. This disrupted Chiang's offensives against the Communists for a time, although it was the northern factions of Hu Hanmin's Kwangtung government (notably the 19th Route Army) that primarily led the offensive against the Japanese during this skirmish. Brought into the Nationalist army immediately after the battle, the 19th Route Army's career under Chiang would be cut short after it was disbanded for demonstrating socialist tendencies.

In December 1936, Chiang flew to Xi'an to coordinate a major assault on the Red Army and the Communist Republic that had retreated into Yan'an. However, Chiang's allied commander Zhang Xueliang, whose forces were used in his attack and whose homeland of Manchuria had been recently invaded by the Japanese, did not support the attack on the Communists. On 12 December, Zhang and several other Nationalist generals headed by Yang Hucheng of Shaanxi kidnapped Chiang for two weeks in what is known as the Xi'an Incident. They forced Chiang into making a "Second United Front" with the Communists against Japan. After releasing Chiang and returning to Nanjing with him, Zhang was placed under house arrest and the generals who had assisted him were executed. Chiang's commitment to the Second United Front was nominal at best, and it was all but dissolved in 1941.

Second Sino-Japanese War

The Second Sino-Japanese War broke out in July 1937, and in August of that year Chiang sent  of his best-trained and equipped soldiers to defend Shanghai. With over 200,000 Chinese casualties, Chiang lost the political cream of his Whampoa-trained officers. Although Chiang lost militarily, the battle dispelled Japanese claims that it could conquer China in three months and demonstrated to the Western powers that the Chinese would continue the fight. By December, the capital city of Nanjing had fallen to the Japanese resulting in the Nanking massacre. Chiang moved the government inland, first to Wuhan and later to Chongqing.

Having lost most of China's economic and industrial centers, Chiang withdrew into the hinterlands, stretching the Japanese supply lines and bogging down Japanese soldiers in the vast Chinese interior. As part of a policy of protracted resistance, Chiang authorized the use of scorched earth tactics, resulting in many civilian deaths. During the Nationalists' retreat from Zhengzhou, the dams around the city were deliberately destroyed by the Nationalist army to delay the Japanese advance, killing up to 800,000 people in the subsequent 1938 Yellow River flood.

After heavy fighting, the Japanese occupied Wuhan in the fall of 1938 and the Nationalists retreated farther inland, to Chongqing. While en route to Chongqing, the Nationalist army intentionally started the "fire of Changsha", as a part of a scorched earth policy. The fire destroyed much of the city, killed twenty thousand civilians, and left hundreds of thousands of people homeless. Due to an organizational error (it was claimed), the fire was begun without any warning to the residents of the city. The Nationalists eventually blamed three local commanders for the fire and executed them. Newspapers across China blamed the fire on (non-KMT) arsonists, but the blaze contributed to a nationwide loss of support for the KMT.

In 1939 Muslim leaders Isa Yusuf Alptekin and Ma Fuliang were sent by Chiang to several Middle Eastern countries, including Egypt, Turkey, and Syria, to gain support for the Chinese War against Japan, and to express his support for Muslims.

The Japanese, controlling the puppet-state of Manchukuo and much of China's eastern seaboard, appointed Wang Jingwei as a Quisling-ruler of the occupied Chinese territories around Nanjing. Wang named himself President of the Executive Yuan and Chairman of the National Government (not the same 'National Government' as Chiang's), and led a surprisingly large minority of anti-Chiang/anti-Communist Chinese against his old comrades. He died in 1944, within a year of the end of World War II.

The Hui Muslim Xidaotang sect pledged allegiance to the Kuomintang after their rise to power and Hui Muslim General Bai Chongxi acquainted Chiang Kai-shek with the Xidaotang jiaozhu Ma Mingren in 1941 in Chongqing.

In 1942 Chiang went on tour in northwestern China in Xinjiang, Gansu, Ningxia, Shaanxi, and Qinghai, where he met both Muslim Generals Ma Buqing and Ma Bufang. He also met the Muslim Generals Ma Hongbin and Ma Hongkui separately.

A border crisis erupted with Tibet in 1942. Under orders from Chiang, Ma Bufang repaired Yushu airport to prevent Tibetan separatists from seeking independence. Chiang also ordered Ma Bufang to put his Muslim soldiers on alert for an invasion of Tibet in 1942. Ma Bufang complied and moved several thousand troops to the Tibetan border. Chiang also threatened the Tibetans with aerial bombardment if they worked with the Japanese. Ma Bufang attacked the Tibetan Buddhist Tsang monastery in 1941. He also constantly attacked the Labrang Monastery.

With the attack on Pearl Harbor and the opening of the Pacific War, China became one of the Allied Powers. During and after World War II, Chiang and his American-educated wife Soong Mei-ling, known in the United States as "Madame Chiang", held the support of the China Lobby in the United States, which saw in them the hope of a Christian and democratic China. Chiang was even named the Supreme Commander of Allied forces in the China war zone. He was appointed Knight Grand Cross of the Order of the Bath in 1942.

General Joseph Stilwell, an American military adviser to Chiang during World War II, strongly criticized Chiang and his generals for what he saw as their incompetence and corruption. In 1944, the United States Army Air Corps commenced Operation Matterhorn to bomb Japan's steel industry from bases to be constructed in mainland China. This was meant to fulfill President Roosevelt's promise to Chiang Kai-shek to begin bombing operations against Japan by November 1944. However, Chiang Kai-shek's subordinates refused to take air base construction seriously until enough capital had been delivered to permit embezzlement on a massive scale. Stilwell estimated that at least half of the $100 million spent on construction of air bases was embezzled by Nationalist party officials.

Chiang tried to balance the influence of the Soviets and the Americans in China during the war. He first told the Americans that they would be welcome in talks between the Soviet Union and China, then secretly told the Soviets that the Americans were unimportant and that their opinions would not be considered. Chiang also used American support and military power in China against the ambitions of the Soviet Union to dominate the talks, stopping the Soviets from taking full advantage of the situation in China with the threat of American military action against the Soviets.

French Indochina 
U.S. President Franklin D. Roosevelt, through General Stilwell, privately made it clear that they preferred that the French not reacquire French Indochina (modern day Vietnam, Cambodia and Laos) after the war was over. Roosevelt offered Chiang control of all of Indochina. It was said that Chiang replied: "Under no circumstances!"

After the war, 200,000 Chinese troops under General Lu Han were sent by Chiang Kai-shek to northern Indochina (north of the 16th parallel) to accept the surrender of Japanese occupying forces there, and remained in Indochina until 1946, when the French returned. The Chinese used the VNQDD, the Vietnamese branch of the Chinese Kuomintang, to increase their influence in Indochina and to put pressure on their opponents. Chiang Kai-shek threatened the French with war in response to maneuvering by the French and Ho Chi Minh's forces against each other, forcing them to come to a peace agreement. In February 1946 he also forced the French to surrender all of their concessions in China and to renounce their extraterritorial privileges in exchange for the Chinese withdrawing from northern Indochina and allowing French troops to reoccupy the region. Following France's agreement to these demands, the withdrawal of Chinese troops began in March 1946.

Ryukyus
During the Cairo Conference in 1943, Chiang said that Roosevelt asked him whether China would like to claim the Ryukyu Islands from Japan in addition to retaking Taiwan, the Pescadores, and Manchuria. Chiang claims that he said he was in favor of an international presence on the islands. However, the U.S. became the occupier of the Ryukyus in 1945 until 1971, when Kishi successfully negotiated with U.S. President Nixon to sign the Okinawa reversion agreement and return Okinawa to Japan.

Second phase of the Chinese Civil War

Treatment and use of Japanese soldiers

In 1945, when Japan surrendered, Chiang's Chongqing government was ill-equipped and ill-prepared to reassert its authority in formerly Japanese-occupied China, and it asked the Japanese to postpone their surrender until Kuomintang (KMT) authority could arrive to take over. American troops and weapons soon bolstered KMT forces, allowing them to reclaim cities. The countryside, however, remained largely under Communist control. Chiang implemented his war-time phrase "repay evil with good" and made a huge effort to protect elements of the Japanese invading army. A Nationalist Chinese court acquitted the Chief Commander of Japanese forces in China, General Okamura Yasuji in 1949, of alleged war crimes and retained him as an advisor to the Nationalist government. Nationalist China repeatedly intervened to protect Okamura from repeated American requests that he testify at the Tokyo war crimes trial.

For over a year after the Japanese surrender, rumors circulated throughout China that the Japanese had entered into a secret agreement with Chiang, in which the Japanese would assist the Nationalists in fighting the Communists in exchange for the protection of Japanese persons and property there. Many top nationalist generals, including Chiang, had studied and trained in Japan before the Nationalists had returned to the mainland in the 1920s, and maintained close personal friendships with top Japanese officers. The Japanese general in charge of all forces in China, General Yasuji Okamura, had personally trained officers who later became generals in Chiang's staff. Reportedly, General Okamura, before surrendering command of all Japanese military forces in Nanjing, offered Chiang control of all 1.5 million Japanese military and civilian support staff then present in China. Reportedly, Chiang seriously considered accepting this offer, but declined only in the knowledge that the United States would certainly be outraged by the gesture. Even so, armed Japanese troops remained in China well into 1947, with some noncommissioned officers finding their way into the Nationalist officer corps. That the Japanese in China came to regard Chiang as a magnanimous figure, to whom many Japanese owed their lives and livelihoods was a fact attested by both Nationalist and Communist sources.

Conditions during the Chinese Civil War 

Historian Odd Arne Westad says the Communists won the Civil War because they made fewer military mistakes than Chiang Kai-shek, and because in his search for a powerful centralized government, Chiang antagonized too many interest groups in China. Furthermore, his party was weakened in the war against Japan. Meanwhile, the Communists told different groups, such as peasants, exactly what they wanted to hear, and cloaked themselves in the cover of Chinese Nationalism.

Following the war, the United States encouraged peace talks between Chiang and Communist leader Mao Zedong in Chongqing. Due to concerns about widespread and well-documented corruption in Chiang's government throughout his rule, the U.S. government limited aid to Chiang for much of the period of 1946 to 1948, in the midst of fighting against the People's Liberation Army led by Mao Zedong. Alleged infiltration of the U.S. government by Chinese Communist agents may have also played a role in the suspension of American aid.

Chiang's right-hand man, the secret police Chief Dai Li, was both anti-American and anti-Communist, as well as a self-declared fascist. Dai ordered Kuomintang agents to spy on American officers. Earlier, Dai had been involved with the Blue Shirts Society, a fascist-inspired paramilitary group within the Kuomintang, which wanted to expel Western and Japanese imperialists, crush the Communists, and eliminate feudalism. Dai Li died in a plane crash, which while some suspect to be an assassination orchestrated by Chiang, the assassination was also rumoured to have been arranged by the American Office of Strategic Services due to Dai's anti-Americanism, because it happened on an American plane.

Although Chiang had achieved status abroad as a world leader, his government deteriorated as the result of corruption and hyperinflation. In his diary in June 1948, Chiang wrote that the KMT had failed, not because of external enemies but because of rot from within. The war had severely weakened the Nationalists, while the Communists were strengthened by their popular land-reform policies, and by a rural population that supported and trusted them. The Nationalists initially had superiority in arms and men, but their lack of popularity, infiltration by Communist agents, low morale, and disorganization soon allowed the Communists to gain the upper hand in the civil war.

Competition with Li Zongren 
A new Constitution was promulgated in 1947, and Chiang was elected by the National Assembly as the first term President of the Republic of China on 20 May 1948. This marked the beginning of what was termed the "democratic constitutional government" period by the KMT political orthodoxy, but the Communists refused to recognize the new Constitution, and its government, as legitimate. Chiang resigned as president on 21 January 1949, as KMT forces suffered terrible losses and defections to the Communists. After Chiang's resignation the vice-president of the ROC, Li Zongren, became China's acting president.

Shortly after Chiang's resignation the Communists halted their advances and attempted to negotiate the virtual surrender of the ROC. Li attempted to negotiate milder terms that would have ended the civil war, but without success. When it became clear that Li was unlikely to accept Mao's terms, the Communists issued an ultimatum in April 1949, warning that they would resume their attacks if Li did not agree within five days. Li refused.

Li's attempts to carry out his policies faced varying degrees of opposition from Chiang's supporters, and were generally unsuccessful. Taylor has noted that Chiang had a superstitious belief in holding Manchuria. After the nationalist military defeat in the province, Chiang lost faith in winning the war and started to prepare for the retreat to Taiwan. Chiang especially antagonized Li by taking possession of (and moving to Taiwan) US$200 million of gold and US dollars belonging to the central government that Li desperately needed to cover the government's soaring expenses. When the Communists captured the Nationalist capital of Nanjing in April 1949, Li refused to accompany the central government as it fled to Guangdong, instead expressing his dissatisfaction with Chiang by retiring to Guangxi.

The former warlord Yan Xishan, who had fled to Nanjing only one month before, quickly insinuated himself within the Li-Chiang rivalry, attempting to have Li and Chiang reconcile their differences in the effort to resist the Communists. At Chiang's request Yan visited Li to convince Li not to withdraw from public life. Yan broke down in tears while talking of the loss of his home province of Shanxi to the Communists, and warned Li that the Nationalist cause was doomed unless Li went to Guangdong. Li agreed to return under the condition that Chiang surrender most of the gold and US dollars in his possession that belonged to the central government, and that Chiang stop overriding Li's authority. After Yan communicated these demands and Chiang agreed to comply with them, Li departed for Guangdong.

In Guangdong, Li attempted to create a new government composed of both Chiang supporters and those opposed to Chiang. Li's first choice of premier was Chu Cheng, a veteran member of the Kuomintang who had been virtually driven into exile due to his strong opposition to Chiang. After the Legislative Yuan rejected Chu, Li was obliged to choose Yan Xishan instead. By this time Yan was well known for his adaptability and Chiang welcomed his appointment.

Conflict between Chiang and Li persisted. Although he had agreed to do so as a prerequisite of Li's return, Chiang refused to surrender more than a fraction of the wealth that he had sent to Taiwan. Without being backed by gold or foreign currency, the money issued by Li and Yan quickly declined in value until it became virtually worthless.
Although he did not hold a formal executive position in the government, Chiang continued to issue orders to the army, and many officers continued to obey Chiang rather than Li. The inability of Li to coordinate KMT military forces led him to put into effect a plan of defense that he had contemplated in 1948. Instead of attempting to defend all of southern China, Li ordered what remained of the Nationalist armies to withdraw to Guangxi and Guangdong, hoping that he could concentrate all available defenses on this smaller, and more easily defensible, area. The object of Li's strategy was to maintain a foothold on the Chinese mainland in the hope that the United States would eventually be compelled to enter the war in China on the Nationalist side.

Final Communist advance 

Chiang opposed Li's plan of defense because it would have placed most of the troops still loyal to Chiang under the control of Li and Chiang's other opponents in the central government. To overcome Chiang's intransigence Li began ousting Chiang's supporters within the central government. Yan Xishan continued in his attempts to work with both sides, creating the impression among Li's supporters that he was a "stooge" of Chiang, while those who supported Chiang began to bitterly resent Yan for his willingness to work with Li. Because of the rivalry between Chiang and Li, Chiang refused to allow Nationalist troops loyal to him to aid in the defense of Kwangsi and Canton, with the result that Communist forces occupied Canton in October 1949.

After Canton fell to the Communists, Chiang relocated the government to Chongqing, while Li effectively surrendered his powers and flew to New York for treatment of his chronic duodenum illness at the Hospital of Columbia University. Li visited the President of the United States, Harry S. Truman, and denounced Chiang as a dictator and an usurper. Li vowed that he would "return to crush" Chiang once he returned to China. Li remained in exile, and did not return to Taiwan.

In the early morning of 10 December 1949, Communist troops laid siege to Chengdu, the last KMT-controlled city in mainland China, where Chiang Kai-shek and his son Chiang Ching-kuo directed the defense at the Chengtu Central Military Academy. Flying out of Chengdu Fenghuangshan Airport, Chiang Kai-shek, father and son, were evacuated to Taiwan via Guangdong on an aircraft called May-ling and arrived the same day. Chiang Kai-shek would never return to the mainland.

Chiang did not re-assume the presidency until 1 March 1950. In January 1952, Chiang commanded the Control Yuan, now in Taiwan, to impeach Li in the "Case of Li Zongren's Failure to carry out Duties due to Illegal Conduct" (李宗仁違法失職案). Chiang relieved Li of the position as vice-president in the National Assembly in March 1954.

On Taiwan

Preparations to retake the mainland 
Chiang moved the government to Taipei, Taiwan, where he resumed his duties as President of the Republic of China on 1 March 1950. Chiang was reelected by the National Assembly to be the President of the Republic of China (ROC) on 20 May 1954, and again in 1960, 1966, and 1972. He continued to claim sovereignty over all of China, including the territories held by his government and the People's Republic, as well as territory the latter ceded to foreign governments, such as Tuva and Outer Mongolia. In the context of the Cold War, most of the Western world recognized this position and the ROC represented China in the United Nations and other international organizations until the 1970s.

During his presidency on Taiwan, Chiang continued making preparations to take back mainland China. He developed the JROTC army to prepare for an invasion of the mainland, and to defend Taiwan in case of an attack by the Communist forces. He also financed armed groups in mainland China, such as Muslim soldiers of the ROC Army left in Yunnan under Li Mi, who continued to fight. It was not until the 1980s that these troops were finally airlifted to Taiwan. He promoted the Uyghur Yulbars Khan to Governor during the Islamic insurgency on the mainland for resisting the Communists, even though the government had already evacuated to Taiwan. He planned an invasion of the mainland in 1962. In the 1950s Chiang's airplanes dropped supplies to Kuomintang Muslim insurgents in Qinghai, in the traditional Tibetan area of Amdo.

Regime 
Despite the democratic constitution, the government under Chiang was a one-party state, consisting almost completely of mainlanders; the "Temporary Provisions Effective During the Period of Communist Rebellion" greatly enhanced executive powers, and the goal of retaking mainland China allowed the KMT to maintain a monopoly on power and the prohibition of opposition parties. The government's official line for these martial law provisions stemmed from the claim that emergency provisions were necessary, since the Communists and KMT were still in a state of war. Seeking to promote Chinese nationalism, Chiang's government actively ignored and suppressed local cultural expression, even forbidding the use of local languages in mass media broadcasts or during class sessions. As a result of Taiwan's anti-government uprising in 1947, known as the February 28 incident, the KMT-led political repression resulted in the death or disappearance of up to 30,000 Taiwanese intellectuals, activists, and people suspected of opposition to the KMT.

The first decades after the Nationalists moved the seat of government to the province of Taiwan are associated with the organized effort to resist Communism known as the "White Terror", during which about 140,000 Taiwanese were imprisoned for their real or perceived opposition to the Kuomintang. Most of those prosecuted were labeled by the Kuomintang as "bandit spies" (匪諜), meaning spies for Chinese Communists, and punished as such or “Taiwanese Separatists”.

Under Chiang, the government recognized limited civil liberties, economic freedoms, property rights (personal and intellectual) and other liberties. Despite these restrictions, free debate within the confines of the legislature was permitted. Under the pretext that new elections could not be held in Communist-occupied constituencies, the National Assembly, Legislative Yuan, and Control Yuan members held their posts indefinitely. The Temporary Provisions also allowed Chiang to remain as president beyond the two-term limit in the Constitution. He was reelected by the National Assembly as president four times—doing so in 1954, 1960, 1966, and 1972.

Believing that corruption and a lack of morals were key reasons that the KMT lost mainland China to the Communists, Chiang attempted to purge corruption by dismissing members of the KMT accused of graft. Some major figures in the previous mainland Chinese government, such as Chiang's brothers-in-law H. H. Kung and T. V. Soong, exiled themselves to the United States. Although politically authoritarian and, to some extent, dominated by government-owned industries, Chiang's new Taiwanese state also encouraged economic development, especially in the export sector. A popular sweeping Land Reform Act, as well as American foreign aid during the 1950s, laid the foundation for Taiwan's economic success, becoming one of the Four Asian Tigers. After retreating to Taiwan, Chiang learned from his mistakes and failures in the mainland and blamed them for failing to pursue Sun Yat-sen's ideals of Tridemism and welfarism. Chiang's land reform more than doubled the land ownership of Taiwanese farmers. It removed the rent burdens on them, with former land owners using the government compensation to become the new capitalist class. He promoted a mixed economy of state and private ownership with economic planning. Chiang also promoted a 9-years free education and the importance of science in Taiwanese education and values. These measures generated great success with consistent and strong growth and the stabilization of inflation.

After the government of the Republic of China moved to Taiwan, Chiang Kai-shek's economic policy turned towards to economic liberalism, he used Sho-Chieh Tsiang and other liberal economists to promote economic liberalization reforms in Taiwan.

However, Taylor has noted that the developmental model of Chiangism in Taiwan still had elements of socialism, and the Gini index of Taiwan was around 0.28 by the 1970s, lower than the relatively equal West Germany. Taiwan was one of the most equal countries in the pro-western bloc. The lower 40% income group doubled their income share to 22% of total income, with the upper 20% shrinking from 61% to 39%, compared to the Japanese rule. The Chiangist economic model can be seen as a form of Dirigisme, with the state playing a crucial role in directing the market economy. Small businesses in Taiwan flourished under this economic model, but it did not see the emergence of corporate monopolies, unlike most other major capitalist countries.

After the democratization of Taiwan, it began to slowly drift away from the Chiangist economic policy to embrace a more free market system, as part of the economic globalization process under the context of neoliberalism.

Chiang personally had the power to review the rulings of all military tribunals which during the martial law period tried civilians as well. In 1950 Lin Pang-chun and two other men were arrested on charges of financial crimes and sentenced to 3–10 years in prison. Chiang reviewed the sentences of all three and ordered them executed instead. In 1954 Changhua monk Kao Chih-te and two others were sentenced to 12 years in prison for providing aid to accused communists, Chiang sentenced them to death after reviewing the case. This control over the decision of military tribunals violated the ROC constitution.

After Chiang's death, the next president, his son, Chiang Ching-kuo, and Chiang Ching-kuo's successor, Lee Teng-hui, a native Taiwanese, would in the 1980s and 1990s increase native Taiwanese representation in the government and loosen the many authoritarian controls of the early era of ROC control in Taiwan.

Relationship with Japan
In 1971, the Australian Opposition Leader Gough Whitlam, who became Prime Minister in 1972 and swiftly relocated the Australian mission from Taipei to Beijing, visited Japan. After meeting with the Japanese Prime Minister, Eisaku Sato, Whitlam observed that the reason Japan at that time was hesitant to withdraw recognition from the Nationalist government was "the presence of a treaty between the Japanese government and that of Chiang Kai-shek". Sato explained that the continued recognition of Japan towards the Nationalist government was due largely to the personal relationship that various members of the Japanese government felt towards Chiang. This relationship was rooted largely in the generous and lenient treatment of Japanese prisoners-of-war by the Nationalist government in the years immediately following the Japanese surrender in 1945, and was felt especially strongly as a bond of personal obligation by the most senior members then in power.

Although Japan recognized the People's Republic in 1972, shortly after Kakuei Tanaka succeeded Sato as Prime Minister of Japan, the memory of this relationship was strong enough to be reported by The New York Times (15 April 1978) as a significant factor inhibiting trade between Japan and the mainland. There is speculation that a clash between Communist forces and a Japanese warship in 1978 was caused by Chinese anger after Prime Minister Takeo Fukuda attended Chiang's funeral. Historically, Japanese attempts to normalize their relationship with the People's Republic were met with accusations of ingratitude in Taiwan.

Relationship with the United States

Chiang was suspicious that covert operatives of the United States plotted a coup against him.

In 1950, Chiang Ching-kuo became director of the secret police (Bureau of Investigation and Statistics), which he remained until 1965. Chiang was also suspicious of politicians who were overly friendly to the United States, and considered them his enemies. In 1953, seven days after surviving an assassination attempt, Wu Kuo-chen lost his position as governor of Taiwan Province to Chiang Ching-kuo. After fleeing to United States the same year, he became a vocal critic of Chiang's family and government.

Chiang Ching-kuo, educated in the Soviet Union, initiated Soviet-style military organization in the Republic of China Military. He reorganized and Sovietized the political officer corps, and propagated Kuomintang ideology throughout the military. Sun Li-jen, who was educated at the American Virginia Military Institute, opposed this.

Chiang Ching-kuo orchestrated the controversial court-martial and arrest of General Sun Li-jen in August 1955, for plotting a coup d'état with the American Central Intelligence Agency (CIA) against his father Chiang Kai-shek and the Kuomintang. The CIA allegedly wanted to help Sun take control of Taiwan and declare its independence.

Death

In 1975, 26 years after Chiang came to Taiwan, he died in Taipei at the age of 87. He had suffered a heart attack and pneumonia in the foregoing months and died from renal failure aggravated with advanced cardiac failure on the 5th of April. Chiang's funeral was held on the 16th of April.

A month of mourning was declared. Chinese music composer Hwang Yau-tai wrote the "Chiang Kai-shek Memorial Song". In mainland China, however, Chiang's death was met with little apparent mourning and Communist state-run newspapers gave the brief headline "Chiang Kai-shek Has Died". Chiang's body was put in a copper coffin and temporarily interred at his favorite residence in Cihu, Daxi, Taoyuan. His funeral was attended by dignitaries from many nations, including US Vice President Nelson Rockefeller, South Korean Prime Minister Kim Jong-pil and two former Japanese prime ministers in Nobusuke Kishi and Eisaku Sato.  (蔣公逝世紀念日) was established on the 5th of April. The memorial day was disestablished in 2007.

When his son Chiang Ching-kuo died in 1988, he was entombed in a separate mausoleum in nearby Touliao (頭寮). The hope was to have both buried at their birthplace in Fenghua if and when it was possible. In 2004, Chiang Fang-liang, the widow of Chiang Ching-kuo, asked that both father and son be buried at Wuzhi Mountain Military Cemetery in Xizhi, Taipei County (now New Taipei City). Chiang's ultimate funeral ceremony became a political battle between the wishes of the state and the wishes of his family.

Chiang was succeeded as president by Vice President Yen Chia-kan and as Kuomintang party ruler by his son Chiang Ching-kuo, who retired Chiang Kai-shek's title of Director-General and instead assumed the position of chairman. Yen's presidency was interim; Chiang Ching-kuo, who was the Premier, became president after Yen's term ended three years later.

Cult of personality 

Chiang's portrait hung over Tiananmen Square before Mao's portrait was set up in its place. People also put portraits of Chiang in their homes and in public on the streets. After his death, the Chiang Kai-shek Memorial Song was written in 1988 to commemorate Chiang Kai-shek. In Cihu, there are several statues of Chiang Kai-shek.

Chiang was popular among many people and dressed in plain, simple clothes, unlike contemporary Chinese warlords who dressed extravagantly.

Quotes from the Quran and Hadith were used by Muslims in the Kuomintang-controlled Muslim publication, the Yuehua, to justify Chiang Kai-shek's rule over China. When the Muslim General and Warlord Ma Lin was interviewed, Ma Lin was described as having "high admiration for and unwavering loyalty to Chiang Kai-shek".

In the Philippines, a school was named in his honour in 1939. Today, Chiang Kai-shek College is the largest educational institution for the Chinoy community in the country.

Philosophy 

The Kuomintang used traditional Chinese religious ceremonies, and promulgated martyrdom in Chinese culture. Kuomintang ideology subserved and promulgated the view that the souls of Party martyrs who died fighting for the Kuomintang, the revolution, and the party founder Dr. Sun Yat-sen were sent to heaven. Chiang Kai-shek believed that these martyrs witnessed events on Earth from heaven after their deaths.

Unlike Sun's original Three Principles of the People ideology that was heavily influenced by Western enlightenment theorists such as Henry George, Abraham Lincoln, Bertrand Russell, and John Stuart Mill, the traditional Chinese Confucian influence on Chiang's ideology is much stronger. Chiang rejected the Western progressive ideologies of individualism, liberalism, and the cultural aspects of Marxism. Therefore, Chiangism is generally more culturally and socially conservative than Sun Yat-sen ideologically. Jay Taylor has described Chiang Kai-shek as a revolutionary nationalist and a “left-leaning Confucian-Jacobinist”.

When the Northern Expedition was complete, Kuomintang Generals led by Chiang Kai-shek paid tribute to Dr. Sun's soul in heaven with a sacrificial ceremony at the Xiangshan Temple in Beijing in July 1928. Among the Kuomintang Generals present were the Muslim Generals Bai Chongxi and Ma Fuxiang.

Chiang Kai-shek considered both Han Chinese and all ethnic minorities of China, the Five Races Under One Union, as descendants of the Yellow Emperor, the mythical founder of the Chinese nation, and belonging to the Chinese Nation Zhonghua Minzu and he introduced this into Kuomintang ideology, which was propagated into the educational system of the Republic of China.

Chiang Kai-shek once said:

Contemporary public perception 

Chiang's legacy has been subjected to heated debates because of the different views held about him. For some, Chiang was a national hero who led the victorious Northern Expedition against the Beiyang Warlords in 1927 and helped achieve Chinese unification. His initial image as the leader of China against Japan's invasion, both before and after the attack on Pearl Harbor, led him to be featured on the cover of Time magazine ten times. Even though China received little American aid compared to Britain and the Soviet Union, it did not fold, as Chiang called on his countrymen to fight to the "bitter end" until their ultimate victory against Japan in 1945. At the same time, some blamed him for not doing enough against the Japanese forces in the lead-up to and during the Second Sino-Japanese War, merely hoping that the United States would get involved, or preferring to hold back his armies for the eventual resumption of war against the Communists.

Some also see him as a champion of anti-Communism, being a key figure during the formative years of the World Anti-Communist League. During the Cold War, he was also seen as the leader who led Free China and the bulwark against a possible Communist invasion. However, Chiang presided over purges, political authoritarianism, and graft during his tenure in mainland China, and ruled throughout a period of imposed martial law. His governments were accused of being corrupt even before he even took power in 1928. He also allied with known criminals like Du Yuesheng for political and financial gains. Some opponents charge that Chiang's efforts in developing Taiwan were mostly to make the island a strong base from which to one day return to mainland China, and that Chiang had little regard for the long-term prosperity and well-being of the Taiwanese people. Critics of his regime often accused him of fascism.

Unlike Chiang's son, who is respected in Taiwan across the political spectrum, Chiang Kai-shek's image is perceived rather negatively in Taiwan, where he was rated the lowest in two opinion polls about the perception of former presidents. His popularity in Taiwan is divided along political lines, enjoying greater support among Kuomintang (KMT) supporters while being generally unpopular among Democratic Progressive Party (DPP) voters and supporters who blame him for the thousands killed during the February 28 Incident and criticise his subsequent dictatorial rule. For example, the 2009 American film Formosa Betrayed depicts him as a brutal dictator responsible for the casualties caused from the February 28 Incident. In sharp contrast to his son, Chiang Ching-kuo, and to Sun Yat-sen, Chiang's memory is rarely invoked by current political parties, including the Kuomintang.

In contrast, his image has been partially rehabilitated in contemporary Mainland China. Until recently he was portrayed as a villain who fought against the "liberation" of China by the Communists, but since the 2000s, he has been portrayed by the media and popular culture in an only slightly negative manner as compared to the total denunciation in the Mao era as a Chinese nationalist who tried to bring about national unification and resisted the Japanese invasion during World War II. For example, Chiang is portrayed sympathetically in the 2009 movie sponsored by the Chinese Communist Party, The Founding of a Republic, as a genuine Chinese nationalist with relatively honest if misguided intentions, even akin to a tragic hero, but whose corrupt governance and mistakes still forced him to flee to Taiwan. He was also depicted in the 2015 movie Cairo Declaration as a reasonably competent Chinese leader who was able to resist the Japanese invaders, greatly increase China's international standing and help reclaim some of its sovereignty during the Second World War in negotiations with other anti-Axis world leaders.

However, Chinese textbooks continue to denounce the KMT under Chiang's leadership for betraying Sun Yat-sen's ideals with his anti-communist cleansings. Even though there has been recognition of the war efforts made by the nationalist army since the reform and opening, the CCP continues to insist that it is the pillar of the Sino-Japanese War against the Japanese invasion. This shift is largely in response to current political landscape of Taiwan, in relation to Chiang's commitment to a unified China and his stance against Taiwanese separatism during his rule of the island, along with the recent détente between the Chinese Communist Party (CCP) and Chiang's KMT.

In contrast to efforts to remove his public monuments in Taiwan, his ancestral home in Fenghua, Zhejiang on mainland China has become a commemorative museum and major tourist attraction. Rana Mitter notes that, "The displays inside [Chiang's villa] give plenty of details of Chiang's role as a leader of the resistance against Japan, all of them very positive, and none painting him as a bourgeois reactionary lackey. Of the Communists, there is very little mention. A generation ago, one might have seen this kind of praise for Chiang in Taiwan, but not in the mainland. In the West, the living, breathing legacy of China's wartime experience continues to be poorly understood."

In the United States and Europe, Chiang was often perceived negatively as the one who lost China to the Communists. His constant demands for Western support and funding also earned him the nickname of "General Cash-My-Check". In the West he has been criticized for his poor military skills. He had a record of issuing unrealistic orders and persistently attempting to fight unwinnable battles, leading to the loss of his best troops.

In recent years, there has been an attempt to find a more moderate interpretation of Chiang. Chiang is now increasingly perceived as a man simply overwhelmed by the events in China, having to fight Communists, Japanese, and provincial warlords simultaneously, while having to reconstruct and unify the country. His sincere, albeit often unsuccessful attempts to build a more powerful nation have been noted by scholars such as Jonathan Fenby, Rana Mitter, and biographer Jay Taylor. Mitter has observed that, ironically, today's China is closer to Chiang's vision than to Mao Zedong's. He argues that the Communists, since the 1980s, have essentially created the state envisioned by Chiang in the 1930s. Mitter concludes by writing that "one can imagine Chiang Kai-shek's ghost wandering round China today nodding in approval, while Mao's ghost follows behind him, moaning at the destruction of his vision". Liang Shuming opined that Chiang Kai-shek's "greatest contribution was to make the CCP successful. If he had been a bit more trustworthy, if his character was somewhat better, the CCP would have been unable to beat him".

Other historians such as Jay Taylor, Robert Cowley, and Anne W. Carroll argue that Chiang's failure was largely caused by external factors outside of Chiang's control. Most notably, the refusal of the Truman administration to support Chiang by withdrawing aid, the foisting of an arms embargo by Marshall, the failed pursuit of a détente between the nationalists and the communists, pushing for a coalition government with the CCP, and the USSR's consistent aid and support for the CCP during the Chinese Civil War.

Family

Wives 

In 1901, in an arranged marriage at age 14, Chiang was married to a fellow villager named Mao Fumei who was illiterate and five years his senior. While married to Mao, Chiang adopted two concubines (concubinage was still a common practice for well-to-do, non-Christian males in China): he took Yao Yecheng (1887–1966) as concubine in late 1912 and married Chen Jieru (陳潔如, 1906–1971) in December 1921. While he was still living in Shanghai, Chiang and Yao adopted a son, Wei-kuo. Chen adopted a daughter in 1924, named Yaoguang (瑤光), who later adopted her mother's surname. Chen's autobiography refuted the idea that she was a concubine. Chen claiming that, by the time she married Chiang, he had already divorced Yao, and that Chen was therefore his wife. Chiang and Mao had a son, Ching-kuo.

According to the memoirs of Chen Jieru, Chiang's second wife (Chen Jieru) contracted gonorrhea from Chiang soon after their marriage. He told her that he acquired this disease after separating from his first wife and living with his concubine Yao Yecheng, as well as with many other women he consorted with. His doctor explained to her that Chiang had sex with her before completing his treatment for the disease. As a result, both Chiang and Chen Jieru believed that they had become sterile; however, a purported miscarriage by Soong Mei-ling in August 1928 would, if it actually occurred, cast serious doubt on whether this was true.

Family tree 

The Xikou (Chikow) Chiangs were descended from Chiang Shih-chieh, who during the 1600s moved there from Fenghua district, and whose ancestors in turn came to southeastern China's Zhejiang (Chekiang) province after moving out of Northern China in the 13th century CE. The 12th century BCE Duke of Zhou's (Duke of Chou) third son was the ancestors of the Chiangs.

His great-grandfather was Chiang Qi-zeng (Jiang Qizeng) 蔣祈增, his grandfather was Chiang Si-qian 蔣斯千, his uncle was Chiang Zhao-hai 蔣肇海, and his father was Chiang Zhao-cong (Jiang Zhaocong) 蔣肇聰.

Religion and relationships with religious communities 

Chiang personally dealt extensively with religions, power figures, and factions in China during his regime.

Religious views 
Chiang Kai-shek was born and raised as a Buddhist, but became a Methodist upon his marriage to his fourth wife, Soong Mei-ling. It was previously believed that this was a political move, but studies of his recently opened diaries suggest that his faith was sincere.

Relationship with Muslims 

Chiang developed relationships with other generals. Chiang became a sworn brother of the Chinese Muslim general Ma Fuxiang and appointed him to high ranking positions. Chiang addressed Ma Fuxiang's son Ma Hongkui as Shao Yun Shixiong Ma Fuxiang attended national leadership conferences with Chiang during battles against Japan. Ma Hongkui was eventually scapegoated for the failure of the Ningxia Campaign against the Communists, so he moved to the US instead of remaining in Taiwan with Chiang.

When Chiang became President of China after the Northern Expedition, he carved out Ningxia and Qinghai out of Gansu province, and appointed Muslim generals as military governors of all three provinces: Ma Hongkui, Ma Hongbin, and Ma Qi. The three Muslim governors, known as Xibei San Ma (lit. "the three Mas of the Northwest"), controlled armies composed entirely of Muslims. Chiang called on the three and their subordinates to wage war against the Soviet peoples, Tibetans, Communists, and the Japanese. Chiang continued to appoint Muslims as governors of the three provinces, including Ma Lin and Ma Fushou. Chiang's appointments, the first time that Muslims had been appointed as governors of Gansu, increased the prestige of Muslim officials in northwestern China. The armies raised by this "Ma Clique", most notably their Muslim cavalry, were incorporated into the KMT army. Chiang appointed a Muslim general, Bai Chongxi, as the Minister of National Defence of the Republic of China, which controlled the ROC military.

Chiang also supported the Muslim General Ma Zhongying, whom he had trained at Whampoa Military Academy during the Kumul Rebellion, in a Jihad against Jin Shuren, Sheng Shicai, and the Soviet Union during the Soviet Invasion of Xinjiang. Chiang designated Ma's Muslim army as the 36th Division (National Revolutionary Army) and gave his troops Kuomintang flags and uniforms. Chiang then supported Muslim General Ma Hushan against Sheng Shicai and the Soviet Union in the Xinjiang War (1937). All Muslim generals commissioned by Chiang in the National Revolutionary Army swore allegiance to him. Several, like Ma Shaowu and Ma Hushan were loyal to Chiang and Kuomintang hardliners.

The Ili Rebellion and Pei-ta-shan Incident plagued relations with the Soviet Union during Chiang's rule and caused trouble with the Uyghurs. During the Ili Rebellion and Peitashan incident, Chiang deployed Hui troops against Uyghur mobs in Turfan, and against Soviet Russian and Mongols at Peitashan.

During Chiang's rule, attacks on foreigners and ethnic minorities by the allied warlords of the Nationalist Government such as the Ma Clique flared up in several incidents. One of these was the Battle of Kashgar where a Muslim army loyal to the Kuomintang massacred 4,500 Uyghurs, and killed several Britons at the British consulate in Kashgar.

Hu Songshan, a Muslim Imam, backed Chiang Kai-shek's regime and gave prayers for his government. ROC flags were saluted by Muslims in Ningxia during prayer along with exhortations to nationalism during Chiang's rule. Chiang sent Muslim students abroad to study at places like Al-Azhar University and Muslim schools throughout China that taught loyalty to his regime.

The Yuehua, a Chinese Muslim publication, quoted the Quran and Hadith to justify submitting to Chiang Kai-shek as the leader of China, and as justification for Jihad in the war against Japan.

The Yihewani (Ikhwan al Muslimun a.k.a. Muslim brotherhood) was the predominant Muslim sect backed by the Chiang government during Chiang's regime. Other Muslim sects, like the Xidaotang and Sufi brotherhoods like Jahriyya and Khuffiya were also supported by his regime. The Chinese Muslim Association, a pro-Kuomintang and anti-Communist organization, was set up by Muslims working in his regime. Salafism attempted to gain a foothold in China during his regime, but the Yihewani and Hanafi Sunni Gedimu denounced the Salafis as radicals, engaged in fights against them, and declared them heretics, forcing the Salafis to form a separate sect. Ma Ching-chiang, a Muslim General, served as an advisor to Chiang Kai-shek. Ma Buqing was another Muslim General who fled to Taiwan along with Chiang. His government donated money to build the Taipei Grand Mosque on Taiwan. Additionally, the Shah of Iran Mohammad Reza Pahlavi donated $100,000 for the construction of the mosque.

Relationship with Buddhists and Christians 
Chiang had uneasy relations with the Tibetans. He fought against them in the Sino-Tibetan War, and he supported the Muslim General Ma Bufang in his war against Tibetan rebels in Qinghai. Chiang ordered Ma Bufang to prepare his Islamic army to invade Tibet several times, to deter Tibetan independence, and threatened the Tibetans with aerial bombardment. Ma Bufang attacked the Tibetan Buddhist Tsang monastery in 1941. After the war, Chiang appointed Ma Bufang as ambassador to Saudi Arabia.

Chiang incorporated Methodist values into the New Life Movement under the influence of his wife. Dancing and Western music were discouraged. In one incident, several youths splashed acid on people wearing Western clothing, although Chiang was not directly responsible for these incidents. Despite being a Methodist, he made reference to the Buddha in his diary, and encouraged the establishment of a Buddhist political party under Master Taixu.

According to Jehovah's Witnesses' magazine The Watchtower, some of their members travelled to Chongqing and spoke to him personally while distributing their literature there during the Second World War.

Honours 

 Republic of China national honours
 Order of National Glory
 Order of Blue Sky and White Sun
 Order of the Sacred Tripod
 Order of Brilliant Jade
 Order of Propitious Clouds
 Order of the Cloud and Banner
 Order of Brilliant Star 
 Honour Sabre of the Awakened Lion

 Foreign honours
 Dominican Republic:
 Order of Merit of Duarte, Sánchez and Mella (January 1940)
 Order of Christopher Columbus (July 1948)
 Grand Cross of the Order of Christopher Columbus (October 1971)
 Philippines:
 Chief Commander of the Philippine Legion of Honor (1949)
 Grand Collar of the Ancient Order of Sikatuna (2 May 1960)
 United States:
 Chief Commander of the Legion of Merit (9 July 1943)
 Distinguished Service Medal (U.S. Army) (March 1946)
 South Korea: Order of Merit for National Foundation (27 November 1953)
 Thailand: Order of the Rajamitrabhorn (5 June 1963)
 Colombia: Order of Boyaca (October 1963)
 United Kingdom: Order of the Bath (1941)
 Peru: Order of the Sun of Peru (October 1944)
 Czechoslovakia: Order of the White Lion (30 May 1945)
 France: Legion of Honour (9 January 1945)
 Chile: Order of Merit (Chile) (29 January 1944)
 Mexico: Order of the Aztec Eagle (April 1945)
 Greece: Order of the Redeemer (22 March 1957)
 Jordan: Supreme Order of the Renaissance (9 March 1959)
 Brazil: Order of the Southern Cross (1944)
 Italy: Order of Saints Maurice and Lazarus (April 1948)
 Sweden: Royal Order of the Seraphim (4 June 1948)
 Spain: 
 Order of Isabella the Catholic (May 1936)
 Order of Civil Merit (1965)
 Venezuela: Order of the Liberator (July 1954)
 Vietnam (Nguyễn dynasty): Kim Khanh Medal (January 1960)
 Belgium: Order of Leopold (Belgium) (4 June 1946)
 Malawi: Order of the Lion (Malawi) (5 August 1967)
 Bolivia: Order of the Condor of the Andes (March 1966)
 Gambia: Order of the Republic of The Gambia (November 1972)
 Argentina: Order of the Liberator General San Martín (October 1960)
 Guatemala: Order of the Quetzal (7 December 1956)
 Nicaragua:
 National Order of Miguel Larreynaga (November 1974)
 Order of Ruben Dario (October 1958)
 Panama: Order of Vasco Núñez de Balboa (February 1960)
 Paraguay: Collar of Marshal Francisco Solano Lopez Grade of National Order of Merit (May 1962)

Selected writings 
  Includes foreword, by Dr. J. Leighton Stuart.--What China has faced, by Mme. Chiang Kai-shek.--Sian: a coup d'e´tat, by Mme. Chiang Kai-shek.--A fortnight in Sian: extracts from a diary, by Chiang Kai-shek.--The Generalissimo's admonition to Chiang Hsueh-liang (sic: i.e. Zhang Xueliang) and Yang Hu-chen (sic: i.e. Yang Hucheng) prior to his departure from Sian.--Names of Chinese persons and places mentioned in the story and diary.
  Authorized translation of 中国之命运 (Zhongguo zhi mingyun) (1943). . Introduction by Lin Yutang.
 .  Unauthorized translation of 中国之命运 (Zhongguo zhi mingyun) (1943) by Philip Jaffe, with his notes and extensive critical commentary.
 The Collected Wartime Messages Of Generalissimo Chiang Kai Shek at Netarchive
 
 —, Works at Internet Archive HERE

See also 

 Chiangism
 Chiang Kai-shek Memorial Hall
 Chiang Kai-shek Memorial Song
 Chiang Kai-shek statues
 Chiang Kai-shek International Airport
 Cihu Mausoleum
 Free area of the Republic of China
 Guesthouses of Chiang Kai-shek
 History of the Republic of China
 History of China–United States relations to 1948
 List of kidnappings
 Politics of the Republic of China
 Republic of China (1912–1949)
 Republic of China Armed Forces
 Shilin Official Residence
 Sino-German cooperation (1926–1941)
 Timeline of Chiang Kai-shek

References

Bibliography and further reading 

 
 Ch'en Chieh-ju. 1993. Chiang Kai-shek's Secret Past: The Memoirs of His Second Wife. Westview Press.   Internet Archive online download and streaming HERE.
 
 
 Crozier, Brian. 2009. The Man Who Lost China. 
 Fairbank, John King, and Denis Twitchett, eds. 1983. The Cambridge History of China: Volume 12, Republican China, 1912–1949, Part 1. 
  Alt URL
 
 Garver, John W. China's Quest: The History of the Foreign Relations of the People's Republic (2nd ed. 2018) comprehensive scholarly history. excerpt 
 
 
 Li, Laura Tyson. 2006. Madame Chiang Kai-shek: China's Eternal First Lady. Grove Press. 
 
 May, Ernest R. 2002. "1947–48: When Marshall Kept the U.S. out of War in China". Journal of Military History 66(4): 1001–1010. online free 
 Paine, S. C. M. The Wars for Asia, 1911–1949 (2014)
 
 
 Romanus, Charles F., and Riley Sunderland. 1959. Time Runs Out in CBI. Official U.S. Army history online edition 
 Sainsbury, Keith. 1985. The Turning Point: Roosevelt, Stalin, Churchill, and Chiang-Kai-shek, 1943. The Moscow, Cairo, and Teheran Conferences. Oxford University Press. 
 Seagrave, Sterling. 1996. The Soong Dynasty. Corgi Books. 
 Stueck, William. 1984. The Wedemeyer Mission: American Politics and Foreign Policy during the Cold War. University of Georgia Press. 
 Tang Tsou. 1963. America's Failure in China, 1941–50. University of California Press. 
 
 
 Tuchman, Barbara W. 1971. Stillwell and the American Experience in China, 1911–45. 
 
 van de Ven, Hans, et al. eds.  Negotiating China's Destiny in World War II (Stanford University Press, 2014). 336 pp. online review 
 Vogel, Ezra F. China and Japan: Facing History (2019)  excerpt

External links 

 ROC Government Biography
 Time "Man and Wife of the Year", 1937
 The National Chiang Kai-shek Memorial Hall Official Site
 The Chungcheng Cultural and Educational Foundation
 Generalissimo Chiang Kai-shek Association Hong Kong
 Order of Generalissimo Chiang Kai-shek supplementing the Act of Surrender – by Japan on 9 September 1945
 Family tree of his descendants (in Simplified Chinese)
 The Chiang Kai-shek Index at the Franklin D. Roosevelt Presidential Library and Museum
 1966 GIO Biographical video
 "The Memorial Song of Late President Chiang Kai-shek" (Ministry of National Defence of ROC) 
 Chiang Kai-shek Biography – From Spartacus Educational
 The National Chiang Kai-shek Cultural Center Official Site
 Chiang Kai-shek Diaries at the Hoover Institution Archives 
 蔣介石的勳章 ORDERS of CHIANG KAI SHEK – SKYFLEET/LUFTFLOTT的部落格/天艦 – udn部落格
 

 
1887 births
1975 deaths
20th-century Chinese heads of government
20th-century Chinese military personnel
20th-century Chinese politicians
Baoding Military Academy cadets
Deified Chinese people
Chinese anti-capitalists
Chinese anti-communists
Chinese nationalists
Chinese Christians
Chinese Methodists
Chinese military personnel of World War II
Chinese Nationalist heads of state
Chinese revolutionaries
Chinese diarists
Converts to Methodism
Foreign recipients of the Legion of Merit
Formerly missing people
Deaths from kidney failure
Generalissimos
Honorary Knights Grand Cross of the Order of the Bath
Japanese military personnel
Kuomintang politicians in Taiwan
Marshals of China
Missing person cases in China
Kidnapped Chinese people
People of the Chinese Civil War
People of the Northern Expedition
People of the 1911 Revolution
People of the Central Plains War
Political repression in Taiwan
Politicians from Ningbo
Premiers of the Republic of China
Presidents of the Republic of China on Taiwan
Recipients of the Order of the Sacred Tripod
Recipients of the Order of the White Lion
Republic of China politicians from Zhejiang
Taiwanese people from Zhejiang
Time Person of the Year
Far-right politics in Taiwan
Tongmenghui members
World War II political leaders
Politicide perpetrators
Recipients of the Order of Saints Maurice and Lazarus
Recipients of the Order of the Sun of Peru
Recipients of the Order of Isabella the Catholic